Campion Association Football Club is a football club based in Manningham area of Bradford, West Yorkshire, England.

History
The club was established by Michael Mahoney in 1963, with players coming from the St Edmund Campion youth club. In 1975 they joined Division Four of the Bradford Sunday League, and the following season also entered a team to the Red Triangle League, a Saturday league. By 1979 they had reached the league's Premier Division, finishing as runners-up and winning the Premier Division Cup in 1979–80.

In 1981 Campion moved up to the West Riding County Amateur League. Although financial difficulties led to them dropping back into the Red Triangle League for the 1985–86 season, the club returned to the West Riding County Amateur League for the 1986–87 season. In 1989–90 the club were Division Two champions, also winning the divisional cup. They went on to win Division One and the divisional cup in 1992–93, earning promotion to the Premier Division.

Campion won the Premier Division Cup in 2003–04, and then three times in succession between 2005–06 and 2007–08. In 2015–16 the club applied for promotion to Division One of the Northern Counties East League, which was achieved after finishing third. At the end of the 2020–21 season the club were transferred to Division One North of the North West Counties League.

Ground

The club play at Scotchman Road. The club house at the ground was built in 2006.

Honours
West Riding County Amateur League
Division One champions 1992–93
Division Two champions 1989–90
Premier Division Cup winners 2003–04, 2005–06, 2006–07, 2007–08
Division One Cup winners 1992–93, 1997–98
Division Two Cup winners 1989–90
Red Triangle League
Premier Division Cup winners 1979–80
West Riding Challenge Cup
Winners 2006–07
West Riding Charity Shield
Winners 2006–07
Bradford & District FA Cup
Winners 2000–01, 2009–10, 2011–12, 2015–16 2016–17

See also
Campion A.F.C. players

References

External links
Official website

Football clubs in England
Football clubs in West Yorkshire
Manningham, Bradford
1963 establishments in England
Association football clubs established in 1963
Leeds Red Triangle Invitation League
West Riding County Amateur Football League
Northern Counties East Football League
North West Counties Football League clubs